Michael Biggs (26 August 1928 – 1993) was an Irish sculptor, stone carver and letterist of English extraction.

Early life
Biggs was born in Stockport in 1928. He was educated at St Columba's College, Dublin and attended Trinity College Dublin in 1946–49, but did not graduate.

Career

Biggs learned with Joseph Cribb in 1948–51. He attended an artist's community in Ditchling, Sussex, founded by Eric Gill, and Biggs became well-known as a carver, letterist and engraver. He also studied under Elizabeth Rivers.

A notable work of his was the Gaelic type used by Dolmen Press. He also designed the lettering for the Series B Banknotes of the Irish pound.

He was elected to the elite artistic institution Aosdána in 1989.

Personal life
Biggs was married to Frances Dooly, a violinist, artist, and designer of stained-glass and tapestries; they had five children. He converted to Roman Catholicism late in life and was buried at St. Patrick’s Church, Enniskerry.

References

Aosdána members
People from Stockport
20th-century Irish sculptors
20th-century calligraphers
1928 births
1993 deaths
Monumental masons
Stone carvers
People educated at St Columba's College, Dublin